Final, Finals or The Final may refer to:

Final (competition), the last or championship round of a  sporting competition, match, game, or other contest which decides a winner for an event
 Another term for playoffs, describing a sequence of contests taking place after a regular season or round-robin tournament, culminating in a final by the first definition.
final (Java), a keyword in the Java programming language
Final case, a grammatical case
Final examination or finals, a test given at the end of a course of study or training
Part of a syllable
Final, a tone of the Gregorian mode

Art and entertainment
Final (film), a science fiction film
The Final (film), a thriller film
Finals (film), a 2019 Malayalam sports drama film
Final (band), an English electronic musical group
Final (Vol. 1), album by Enrique Iglesias
The Final (album), by Wham!
"The Final", a song by Dir en grey on the album Withering to Death
 Finals (comics), a four-issue comic book mini-series.
 Final (Java) java keyword, defining an entity that can only be assigned once.

See also
 Final approach (disambiguation)
 Finale (disambiguation)
 Finality (disambiguation)
 Finally (disambiguation)